
Gmina Budzyń is a rural gmina (administrative district) in Chodzież County, Greater Poland Voivodeship, in west-central Poland.

Villages
Gmina Budzyń contains the villages and settlements of Brzekiniec, Budzyń, Bukowiec, Dziewoklucz, Grabówka, Kąkolewice, Niewiemko, Nowawieś Wyszyńska, Nowe Brzeźno, Ostrówki, Podstolice, Popielno, Prosna, Sokołowo Budzyńskie, Wyszynki and Wyszyny.

Neighbouring gminas
Gmina Budzyń is bordered by the gminas of Chodzież, Czarnków, Margonin, Rogoźno, Ryczywół and Wągrowiec.

References
Polish official population figures 2020

Budzyn
Chodzież County